Namma Veettu Lakshmi is a 1966 Indian Tamil-language drama film produced and directed by B. R. Panthulu. It is a remake of his own Kannada film Dudde Doddappa, released in the same year. Panthulu also stars as the male lead, alongside M. V. Rajamma, A. V. M. Rajan, R. Muthuraman and Nagesh. The film was released on released on 5 August 1966 and became a commercial success.

Plot 

An ordinary man becomes wealthy in a rags to riches manner through hard work. He lives with his wife Saradamma, two sons and a daughter, who are the opposite of him without the same work ethics. Saradamma is obsessed with a pompous lifestyle. The first son, a graduate, sees himself smarter than his father and disobeys him, while spending lavishly and living leisurely. The second son Raju does not care about anything except acting.

One day, the patriarch tells his family that he has lost all his wealth, much to their horror. They are forced to shift to a village, where the patriarch and Saradamma run a small business to eke out a living. Their children finally realise the value of their father's teachings. The patriarch eventually reveals that their wealth is safe and that he played this game just to teach them the values of life.

Cast 
Male cast
 B. R. Panthulu as the patriarch
 A. V. M. Rajan as the graduate
 Nagesh as Raju
 R. Muthuraman

Female cast
 M. V. Rajamma as Saradamma
 Bharati as Saradamma's daughter
 Vanisri

Production 
After the success of the Kannada film Dudde Doddappa (1966), its producer-director and male lead B. R. Panthulu of Padmini Pictures decided to remake it in Tamil under the title Namma Veettu Lakshmi. Panthulu returned to his positions in the remake, as did M. V. Rajamma, the female lead of the original and Bharati, who played the daughter of the couple. Cinematography was handled by V. Ramamurthy, and editing by R. Devarajan. Ma Ra, the writer of the Kannada original, also wrote for the remake.

Soundtrack 
The soundtrack was composed by M. S. Viswanathan, and the lyrics were written by Kannadasan.

Release 
Namma Veettu Lakshmi was released on 5 August 1966, and became a commercial success.

References

External links 
 

1960s Tamil-language films
1966 drama films
Films directed by B. R. Panthulu
Films scored by M. S. Viswanathan
Indian drama films
Tamil remakes of Kannada films